Antonio López Peláez (born 11 December 1965) is a Spanish Professor of Social Work and Social Services, Department of Social Work, Faculty of Law, National Distance Education University (UNED), Spain.

Biography 
Antonio López Peláez was instrumental in the implementation of social work studies at the UNED, serving as the first academic secretary of the degree in Social Work (2003-2005). He was the first Full Professor of Social Work and Social Services at UNED (2010). He is currently the Director of the Chair in innovation in Social Services and Dependency, the first chair of its kind to be created on this subject in the Spanish university system, and the Chair in Social Inclusion of the UNED. His work is focused on Digital Social Work, Social Welfare, Participation and Social Policy. From 2020 to the present, is serving as Executive Director of the International Council on Social Welfare (ICSW).

He was the founding editor of the journal Comunitania. International Journal of Social Work and Social Sciences (2011-2022), managing to place it in Quartile 1 in the bibliographic database Dialnet in 2020. He was the founding director of the Master in Social Work, Welfare State and Metholodogies of Social Intervention at UNED (2013-2020). Director of the UNED Associated Center of Segovia (2006-2015), during his tenure the university center was awarded with the bronze medal of the city of Segovia (2009), one of the most important news of 2009 in Segovia according to the newspaper El Adelantado.

In a society of digital natives, he has highlighted the relationship between late emancipation and the crisis of legitimacy of democratic institutions. Within his contributions to digital social work, he has highlighted how technological innovations transform welfare systems, and how digital innovation has become a key tool to address humanitarian crises. During the COVID-19 pandemic, he launched in March 2020 the first Spanish-language YouTube channel on Digital Social Work, which has been recognized as a means "of sharing information and disseminating guidance for social work practice and innovative interventions". In 2022, he served as co-Chair of The Joint World Conference on Social Work, Education and Social Development (SWESD2022) (Seoul, 26–28 October 2022), under the theme "Redefining Social Policy and Social Work Practice in a Post-Pandemic Society: Social Welfare Programs and Social Work Education at a Crossroads". In 2023, his article "Food security and social protection in times of COVID-19" has become the Top Trending article in the International Social Work Journal.

Works

References

Bibliography 

 
 
 
 
 

1965 births
Living people
People from Málaga
Social work scholars